INS Sukanya is the lead vessel of the s of the Indian Navy. In Sanatan Dharma, Sukanya was the daughter of Shryayati, son of Vaivasvata Manu and the wife of the great sage Chyavana. It was commissioned into service on 31 August 1989.

Service history
In 2006, INS Sukanya served as the Presidential yacht for the 2006 Naval Fleet Review. In February 2010, Sukanya escorted the Maldivian Coast Guard vessel  home via Colombo, Sri Lanka. Huravee was returning home after a refit in India.

On 20 and 24 September 2011, pirates in the Gulf of Aden attempted to approach vessels being escorted by INS Sukanya. The attack was warded off and the pirates disarmed by a team of marine commandos. Indian Navy officials seized three rifles, eight magazines and about 320 rounds of ammunition from the pirate boat with 14 pirates. Ladders and grapnels used by pirates to board merchant vessels were recovered. The boat was carrying a large quantity of fuel and LPG cylinders, in addition to communication and navigation equipment. This was the fourth time INS Sukanya thwarted a pirate attack in the Gulf of Aden. On 11 November 2011, Sukanya again thwarted piracy attempts near the Gulf of Aden.

In December 2014, a fire damaged the only de-salination plant in Maldives plunging it into a severe water crisis. On 4 December 2014, INS Sukanya, while patrolling off Kochi, was immediately diverted to Maldives. The ship carries two de-salination plants on board with capacity to produce 20 tonnes of fresh water daily which were used to avert the water crisis.

References

Sukanya-class patrol vessels
Patrol vessels of the Indian Navy
Naval ships of India
1989 ships